The 2015 Sun Belt Conference softball tournament will be held at the Bobcat Softball Complex on the campus of the Texas State University in San Marcos, Texas, from May 6 through May 9, 2015. The tournament winner will earn the Sun Belt Conference's automatic bid to the 2015 NCAA Division I softball tournament. Day one of the tournament acts as a single elimination tournament, while Day 2 begins a double elimination format among the remaining 4 teams. The championship game will be winner takes all. Days 1 & 2 of the tournament will be streamed via sunbeltsports.org. Days 3 and 4 of the tournament (semifinals & championship) will be televised on ESPN3.

Tournament

Day One Bracket 1

Day One Bracket 2

Days Two-Four

All times listed are Central Daylight Time.

Broadcasters
Day 1: Dan McDonald (sunbeltsports.org)

tournament
Sun Belt Conference softball tournament